Lochaber is a locality located within the Naracoorte Lucindale Council in the Limestone Coast region of South Australia.

Lochaber is located within the federal division of Barker, the state electoral district of MacKillop and the local government area of the  Naracoorte Lucindale Council.

References

Limestone Coast